Isidre Nonell i Monturiol (30 November 1872 – 21 February 1911) was a Spanish artist known for his expressive portrayal of socially marginalized individuals in late 19th-century Barcelona.

Life
Isidre Nonell was born in 1872 in Barcelona. His parents, Isidre Nonell i Torras de Arenys de Mar and Àngela Monturiol i Francàs of Barcelona, owned a small but prosperous factory which made soup noodles. Together with his childhood friend, Joaquim Mir, with whom he attended the same school in the neighborhood of Sant Pere in the old part of town in Barcelona, he developed artistic ambitions at an early age.

His early teachers included Josep Mirabent, Gabriel Martínez Altés and Lluís Graner. From 1893 to 1895 he studied at the Escola de Belles Arts de Barcelona (Fine Arts School of Barcelona). He met Ricard Canals, Ramón Pichot, Juli Vallmitjana, Adrià Gual, and Joaquin Sunyer with whom he developed an interest in landscape painting, studying light. The study of sunlight and its effects on color were a main part of Impressionism, which was then active. They were called the "Saffron Group" for the warm tones they used, as well as the "Sant Martí Group" after the town they painted in.

In 1894, he began producing illustrations for La Vanguardia.

In 1896, Nonell went with Ricard Canals and Juli Vallmitjana to the spa town of Caldes de Boí in the Catalan Pyrenees to work at the spa run by Vallmitjana's family. There, he saw a large number of people suffering from the illness of cretinism, which became a subject of his paintings.

In February 1897, he went to Paris with Ricard Canals. There he exhibited and shared a studio with Picasso. He returned to Barcelona in 1900. At the beginning of 1901, he made paintings of women, such as gypsy and working-class women, and still lifes. He exhibited in the Sala París in Barcelona twice, in 1902 and 1903. The reaction to his works of poor gypsy women was very hostile. 

He died of typhoid fever in Barcelona, aged 38.

His work
The oil paintings show the influence of impressionism and pointillism expressed in a new way. Thick strokes layered one after another do not quite mix colors in the eye, leaving a directness of emotion. His subjects, most often women, were the overlooked and marginalized—poor women (often with children), gypsies, wounded soldiers repatriated from the Cuban war, and people suffering from cretinism.

References

Bibliography 
 VV.AA.: Isidre Nonell (1872–1911), Editorial MNAC, Barcelona i Fundación Cultural Mapfre, Madrid 2000, 
 VV.AA.: Isidre Nonell, Editorial Polígrafa, Barcelona 1996, 
 Fontbona, Francesc, Nonell, Gent Nostra, Thor, Barcelona 1987.
 Jardí, Enric: Nonell, Editorial Polígrafa, Barcelona 1984, 
Robinson, William H. et al, Barcelona and Modernity: Picasso, Gaudí, Miró, Dalí. Cleveland Museum of Art in association with Yale University Press, New Haven and London, 2006.

External links
 www.isidrenonell.cat  Catalogue raisonné 
Isidre Nonell on Google Arts & Culture

Post-impressionist painters
Artists from Catalonia
19th-century Spanish painters
19th-century Spanish male artists
Spanish male painters
20th-century Spanish painters
20th-century Spanish male artists
1872 births
1911 deaths